The 1959 Western Illinois Leathernecks football team represented Western Illinois University as a member of the Interstate Intercollegiate Athletic Conference (IIAC) during the 1959 NCAA College Division football season. They were led by third-year head coach Lou Saban and played their home games at Hanson Field. The Leathernecks finished the season with a perfect 9–0 record overall and a 6–0 record in conference play, winning the IIAC title. Despite its record, the team was unable to participate in a postseason bowl game, as the Illinois state teachers college board banned its schools from participating in postseason sporting events.

Schedule

References

Western Illinois
Western Illinois Leathernecks football seasons
Interstate Intercollegiate Athletic Conference football champion seasons
College football undefeated seasons
Western Illinois Leathernecks football